Ononin is an isoflavone glycoside, the 7-O-β-D-glucopyranoside of formononetin, which in turn is the 4'-O-methoxy derivative of the parent isoflavone daidzein.

Natural sources 
Ononin is a major isoflavone  found in a number of plants and herbs like soybean and Glycyrrhiza uralensis.

Pharmacokinetics 
Intestinal bacterial metabolic pathways may include demethylation and deglycosylation. It follows that formation of formononetin and/or daidzein is possible.

Pharmacodynamics 
An in vitro anti-inflammatory effect on lipopolysaccharide (LPS)-induced inflammation has been demonstrated in one study.

References 

O-methylated isoflavones
Isoflavone glucosides